The 2007 Sun Belt Conference men's basketball tournament took place February 28–March 6, 2007 at the Cajundome in Lafayette, Louisiana.

Bracket

References

Sun Belt Conference men's basketball tournament
Tournament
Sun Belt Conference men's basketball tournament
Sun Belt Conference Men's Basketball 
Sun Belt Conference men's basketball tournament
College sports tournaments in Louisiana